The Ducati 999 is a sport bike made by Ducati from 2003 to 2006. It superseded the Massimo Tamburini designed Ducati 916, Ducati 996 and Ducati 998 range of superbikes. This motorcycle enjoyed great success in World Superbike, and was raced in the series through the 2007 season, despite no longer being produced, pending rules changes by the series' governing body, FIM, to allow competition of the new Ducati 1098.

The 999 was designed by Pierre Terblanche, amid much controversy over its styling. It is known as a high performance, race oriented motorcycle. With its traditional Ducati L Twin Desmodromic Valve actuated engine layout, it has a linear power delivery, with high power and torque figures available even at low RPM. Additionally, with its high spec suspension and trellis chassis, it is one of the finest handling motorcycles for its time.

The 2005 Ducati 999S won the Maxisport category for the prestigious international Masterbike 2005 comparison and finished second overall. It has received critical acclaim from many corners, such as MCN of the U.K. which called it "simply the best V-Twin on the planet", and Motorbikestoday.com, which described it as "the most desirable, most exciting roadbike on the planet" in 2004. MotorcycleUSA.com described it as "stupendous" and "the epitome of V-Twin power." Also known as “the F1 of the motorcycles” in 2005.

Racing
From the start the 999 was very successful in the Superbike World Championship, winning world championships in:
 2003 Neil Hodgson
 2004 James Toseland
 2006 Troy Bayliss
Gregorio Lavilla also won the 2005 BSB Title on a 999 F04.

Specifications

References

999
Sport bikes
Motorcycles introduced in 2003
Motorcycles designed by Pierre Terblanche